Atma Ram Sanatan Dharma College (ARSD College), formerly Sanatan Dharma College, is a co-educational constituent college of the University of Delhi. The college was founded on August 3, 1959, by the Sanatan Dharma Maha Sabha, Delhi. Late Shri Atma Ram Chadha, a philanthropist, took over as chairman of the college governing body in 1967. The current chairman of the college is Prof. Renu Deswal.

Rankings

Atma Ram Sanatan Dharma College is among the best colleges in India. It is ranked 7th amongst colleges across India and ranked 4th among Delhi University colleges as per the NIRF India Rankings 2022.

Academics
The college offers various undergraduate and postgraduate courses under the aegis of the University of Delhi.

Undergraduate courses
 B.A. Programme
B.A. Honours: Economics,  English, Hindi, History, Political Science
 B.Com Honours/Programme
 B.Sc. Programme
B.Sc. Honours: Chemistry, Computer Science, Electronics, Mathematics, Physics
B.Sc.:Physical Science

Postgraduate courses
 Masters of Arts English, Hindi, Political Science
 Master of Commerce

Add-on courses
 Computer Courses
 French Language
 Mastering the Stock Market - Experiential Learning
 Financial Modelling — Data Analysis with MS - EXCEL
 Understanding of Taxation : GST and its applications"

Clubs and societies

FIC (Finance and Investment Cell) 
Finance and Investment Cell is essentially a common platform for all finance enthusiasts to learn through knowledge sharing. To keep the passion for finance alive, we organize different events related to the subject matter throughout the year.

The cell aims to provide a stimulus to knowledge sharing by organizing interactive discussions, seminars, forums, competitions and other activities in the area of finance. It aims to enlighten students about complex yet interesting fields of finance and investments and their respective practical applications. It is a confluence of Finance, Economics and Commerce brought together to appease the inner enthusiasm of students.

DHIRAH
Dhirah is the Spiritual society of ARSD College. It is the need of present society and specially youth to connect with real knowledge and develop moral values, the society carrying forward the legacy of our scriptures guides students towards the truth.

NSS
The college has a NSS unit.

Nimbus
The college has an active debating society, Nimbus (The Debaters), helping students learn the art of debating. In the published annual report from 2012, the society talks about its aim to develop visionary leaders. The society saw a major restructuring in the same year and has gained recognition in the college as well as university debating circuits.

Rangayan
The Dramatics Society, Rangayan, was founded in 2005 with the aim of inculcating in the students an appreciation for theatre and dramaturgy as well as highlighting the collective conscience as an imperative. In the fourteen years since its inception, Rangayan has worked towards staging productions that serve to entertain and educate. Rangayan organizes a three-day theatre festival at Sri Ram Centre every year, titled Rangsheersh Jaidev Natyotsav, in honour of Dr. Jaidev Taneja, a drama critic and founder of Rangayan. The Society also organizes a month-long theatre workshop for theatre enthusiasts at the beginning of the session. Rangayan is an integral part of the College's community outreach programmes as well.

NCC
ARSD NCC is one of the most active student bodies of the college. The college maintains two platoons of NCC (Army Wing) where only men can participate in NCC. Every year, cadets from the NCC units of the college are selected to participate in the Republic Day parade. Cadets have also been selected for youth change programs and participated in drills in China and Sri Lanka.

TILT
The Film Appreciation Society of ARSD College is a film club that holds film screenings, readings, and discussions in the college.

Ambedkar Study Circle
The theme of this study circle is to highlight the role played by ‘Nation Builder Baba Sahib Bhim Rao Ambedkar’. The society aims at teaching the contemporary relevance of Ambedkar's views and how all the sections of the society should learn from his ideals.

Gandhi Study Circle
The Gandhi Study Circle, ARSD College, is dedicated to propagate the message of Gandhiji to young students as well as the college fraternity to instil the values of satya, ahimsa and shanti. The Gandhi Study Circle provides an active platform to the students to express diverse opinions on different topics, going beyond mere promotion of Gandhian values. To achieve the stipulated objectives the society organizes seminars, debates, quiz competitions, peace marches, observance on Gandhi Jayanti and Martyr's Day. The Gandhi Study Circle attempts to understand Gandhi and place Gandhian thought and its relevance within a contemporary framework. The members of the Gandhi Study Circle and students of our College have also been involved in the activities of Gandhi Bhawan, University of Delhi.

Arteysania
The purpose of the Art and Craft society in ARSD College is to ensure all-round personality development of the students of the College .The attempt is made by the Society to enhance the artistic traits of the students, and identify and encourage those with an inclination to any arts or crafts of their choice.

PixElation
PixElation is the photography society of ARSD College.

Enactus
Enactus, previously known as Students in Free Enterprise is an international non-profit organization that works with university students to make a difference in their communities along with developing their skills to become socially responsible entrepreneurs. The college has an active Enactus chapter that undertakes various social entrepreneurship projects.

Women Development Cell
The Women Development Cell was instituted at ARSD College with the objective to mainly empower female students of the College. It believes in strengthening students by creating awareness about socio-political, cultural, and legal perspectives through talks, workshops and symposia. Through its myriad activities—street plays, creative writing, poster-making, debates, movie screenings, group discussions, gender sensitization workshops, yoga workshops, self-defense training courses — the Cell sensitizes and educates female students in a holistic manner. The Cell conducts self defense and women safety  training workshop for female students.

Vedanta
Vedanta is the Hindi Debate Committee of Atma Ram Sanatan Dharma College.

Cultural Society
The Culture Society of ARSD aims to encourage students’ interest, participation and responsibility by providing social, cultural and recreational activities for the College community. Keeping this in mind the College has different groups which give students an opportunity to demonstrate and develop their talent in the fields of music, dance and other fields of culture, giving a boost to their physical and mental health.

Saarang 
Saarang is the music society of the ARSD College.

Kalashree 
Kalashree is a dance club in the college that provides a platform for students who have interest in folk dance as well as classical and semi-classical dance forms of India.

A-Crew Unit 
A-Crew Unit is a western dance group in the college.

Stellar 
In modern era, the study of culture and human societies, studies fashion. Fashion means presenting oneself in clothing, footwear, lifestyle, accessories, makeup, and hairstyle.

Publication
The college publishes the magazine Udayachal every year. It contains articles, writings, stories, and essays contributed by the students and staff. The magazine showcases the educational, research, cultural and
sports activities of the college. It has sections in English, Hindi and Sanskrit.

Notable alumni
The notable alumni of the college include.

 Ramakant Goswami, minister in Delhi government
 Jaspreet Jasz, singer
 Rajkumar Rao, actor
 Sudhir Chaudhary, Senior Editor Zee News

See also

 Education in India
 Education in Delhi
 List of institutions of higher education in Delhi
 Sanatan Dharma College
 University of Delhi

References

External links
 Website

1959 establishments in Delhi
South West Delhi district
Universities and colleges in Delhi
Delhi University
Educational institutions established in 1959